FC Prykarpattia Ivano-Frankivsk may refer to:

 FC Prykarpattia Ivano-Frankivsk (1940), also known as FC Spartak
 FC Prykarpattia Ivano-Frankivsk (1998), also known as FC Teplovyk
 FC Prykarpattia Ivano-Frankivsk (2004), also known as FC Fakel